The 1973–74 Virginia Squires season was the 4th season of the Squires in the American Basketball Association. The team finished 6th in points scored at 106.3 points per game and 9th in points allowed at 111.3 points per game. The team was 15–27 midway through the season, but they went 13–29 in the second half of the season. Their biggest losing streak was 6 games, with their highest winning streak being 3 games, done twice. Despite this, they clinched the fourth and final playoff spot by 7 games. The Squires lost to Dr. J and the New York Nets in the Semifinals in 5 games. The money troubles that had troubled the franchise meant that the Squires were forced to trade away pivotal players of the franchise in order to provide short term stability. Julius Erving (along with Willie Sojourner) was traded to the New York Nets for George Carter and cash before the season started. Swen Nater was traded on November 21, 1973 to the San Antonio Spurs. The night of the All-Star Game, it was announced that the Squires sold George Gervin to the San Antonio Spurs for $225,000. Gervin's last game with the team was on February 1, but a court battle delayed his play with the Spurs, though it was all settled in favor of the Spurs by March 3. This was the last season the Squires made the playoffs as they went into a tailspin for the next two season, losing over 60 games each season.

Roster 
 34 Mike Barr - Shooting guard
 31 Roger Brown - Center
 35 George Carter - Small forward
 25 Jim Eakins - Center
 -- Scott English - Small forward
 44 George Gervin - Shooting guard
 30 George Irvine - Small forward
 12 Jim Ligon - Power forward
 4 Larry Miller - Shooting guard
 31 Swen Nater - Center
 40 Barry Parkhill - Shooting guard
 5 Cincy Powell - Power forward
 14 Roland Taylor - Point guard
 13 Dave Twardzik - Point guard
 11 Bernie Williams - Shooting guard

Final standings

Eastern Division

Playoffs
Eastern Division Semifinals

Squires lose series, 4–1

Awards and honors
1974 ABA All-Star Game selections (game played on January 30, 1974) at Norfolk Scope in Norfolk, Virginia
 George Gervin
 Jim Eakins

References

 Squires on Basketball Reference

External links
 RememberTheABA.com 1973-74 regular season and playoff results
 RememberTheABA.com Virginia Squires page

Virginia Squires
Virginia
Virginia Squires, 1973-74
Virginia Squires, 1973-74